Son of Woman is a Postcolonial Kenyan crime fiction novel by Charles Mangua, which was first published in 1971 in Nairobi, Kenya. In a country struggling to reclaim identity, Mangua creates a character that is "returning to a homeland….using an available asset to begin a new career;" a character and story that resonates with the larger population.

Summary

Dodge Kiunya was raised by his prostitute mother until her death, then raised by her prostitute friend before being sent off to the countryside at 11 years of age. He eventually graduates college and obtains a civil service job with the Ministry of Labour and Social Services, Dodge's life is "littered with illicit dealings and fast living, climaxing with a bungled robbery." Upon being released from prison, Dodge claims that "Prison didn't change [him]. It hardened [him]." He finds out his childhood friend, Tonia, has been in prison and bails her out. The two then decide that with both of their pasts, they might as well get married and move to Mombasa where nobody knows them.

Awards

The novel has run into 6 reprints, and Mangua published the sequel, Son of Woman in Mombasa, in 1986. Son of Woman won the Jomo Kenyatta Prize for Literature in 1970.

Criticism

It has been argued that Mangua misrepresented Kenyan women and provided them with a bad label, particularly with Dodge's mother and her friend. Nici Nelson argued in his article "Representations of Men and Women, City and Town in Kenyan Novels of the 1970s and 1980s" that "women are often represented in these [Kenyan] novels…manipulating their sexual attractiveness to men to entice, tantalize, and entrap male characters."
Tom Odhiambo also argues that in Son of Woman, "the female subject appears most often as the victim, the loser, or the underprivileged," while pointing out that those individuals on the periphery of socioeconomic class in postcolonial Africa "have historically invented means and strategies of survival that perpetually play on the possibilities of success."

References 

Greenfield, Kathleen. "Self and Nation in Kenya: Charles Mangua's 'Son of Woman.'" The Journal of Modern African Studies 33.4 (Dec., 1995), pp. 685–698. Print.
Asego, Nicholas. "Kenya: Charles Mangua– A True Son of Woman." The Standard. 15 July 2006. 	All Africa. Web. 16 October 2013. *
Nelson, Nici. Representations of Men and Women, City and Town in Kenyan Novels of the 1970s and 1980s African Languages and Cultures  9.2 Gender and Popular Culture (1996), pp. 145–168. Print.
Odhiambo, Tom. "Positively Popular: African Culture in the Mainstream." Research in African Literatures 39.4 (Winter, 2008), pp. 72–82.

Kenyan novels
Postcolonial novels
1971 novels
Crime novels